Arden is a unisex given name and an English surname of locational origin. It is derived from three places thus called in the United Kingdom: in Yorkshire North Riding, Cheshire, or the Forest of Arden in Warwickshire. This last Arden family from Warwickshire is one of only three that can trace their ancestry back to before 1066.

Given name
 Arden L. Bement Jr. (born 1932), American engineer and scientist
 Arden Cho (born 1985), American actress, singer, and model
 Arden Eddie (born 1947), Canadian baseball player, team owner, and manager
 Arden Hayes (born 2008), American child prodigy
 Arden Haynes, Canadian businessman
 Arden Hilliard (1904–1976), member of the Hypocrites' Club at Oxford University
 Arden Key (born 1996), American football player
 Arden Maddison (1900–1987), English footballer
 Arden Mounts, former NASCAR Cup Series driver
 Arden Myrin (born 1973), American actress and comedian
 Arden Rose (born 1995), actress, author, and internet personality
 Arden "Freddie" Sessler (1923–2000), brother of Siegi Sessler 
 Arden R. Smith (born 1966), member of the Elvish Linguistic Fellowship

Fictional characters
 Ardyn Izunia, the main antagonist of the video game, Final Fantasy XV
 Arden Lyn, a human female assassin from the video game, Star Wars: Masters of Teräs Käsi
 Arden, a armor knight from the Fire Emblem series of games

Surname
 Alice Arden (1516–1551), English murderer, burnt at the stake.
 Annabel Arden (born 1959), British actress, theatre and opera director
 Bruce Arden (born 1927), American computer scientist
 Cecil Arden (1894–1989), American opera singer
 Charles Noble Arden-Clarke (1898–1962), British colonial administrator
 David M. Arden (born 1949), American classical pianist
 Don Arden (1926–2007), English music manager, agent, and businessman
 Donn Arden (1916 or 1917–1994), American choreographer
 Edward Arden (c. 1542 – 1583) head of the Arden family, executed as a Catholic martyr.
 Edwin Hunter Pendleton Arden (1864–1918), American actor, theatre manager, and playwright
 Elizabeth Arden (1878–1966), American businesswoman, the founder of a cosmetics company of the same name
 Eve Arden (1908–1990), American actress
 Jane Arden (disambiguation), several people
 Jann Arden (born 1962), Canadian singer/songwriter
 John Arden (1930–2012), English playwright
 Mark Arden (born 1956), British comedian and actor
 Mary Arden (c. 1537 – 1608), mother of William Shakespeare
 Mary Arden (actress) (1933–2014), US actress
 Mary Arden (judge) (born 1947), British judge
 Michael Arden (born 1982), American stage actor, singer, and composer
 Richard Pepper Arden, 1st Baron Alvanley (1744–1804) British barrister and Whig politician
 Roy Arden (born 1957), Canadian photographer
 Thomas Arden (1508–1550) Mayor of Faversham, murdered by his wife Alice and her lover Richard Moseby 
 Tom Arden (1961–2015), Australian author
 Toni Arden (1924–2012), American singer
 William Arden, pseudonym of the American author Dennis Lynds (1924–2005)

Fictional characters
 Dale Arden, a fictional character in Flash Gordon
 Jane Arden (comics), a character from the eponymous syndicated newspaper comic strip

See also
 Jane Arden (disambiguation)
 Lady Arden

References

Given names
Surnames
English toponymic surnames
Surnames of English origin
English-language unisex given names